The 2020 Hula Bowl was a post-season college football all-star game played on January 26, 2020, at 5:30 p.m. HST (10:30 p.m. EST), at Aloha Stadium in Honolulu, Hawaii. The game featured "NCAA college football players from all divisions, along with international players". The game was the last of the 2019–20 bowl games and, while not restricted to FBS players, it was the final game of the 2019 FBS football season.

This was the first playing of the Hula Bowl since January 12, 2008. Head coaches were Rex Ryan and Mike Smith, who both previously coached at the college and professional levels. Scouts from the CFL, NFL, and XFL were expected to attend. Television coverage was provided by the CBS Sports Network. With news magazine Newsweek as the title sponsor, the game was officially the Newsweek Hula Bowl.

Players
The game's official website had a page for team rosters, with notable and selected players listed below. The total number of players in the Hula Bowl was capped at 100. There were over two dozen players in the game from Football Championship Subdivision (FCS) programs.

Game summary
The game utilized NFL rules, with some modifications, including: all kickoffs and punts fielded by fair catch, and no blitzing allowed. Team Aina wore red uniforms, while Team Kai wore blue uniforms.

See also
 2020 NFL Draft

References

External links
 
 Team Aina group photo & roster
 Team Kai group photo & roster
 Photo gallery via Honolulu Star-Advertiser
 Hula Bowl Highlights 2020 via YouTube

Hula Bowl
American football competitions in Honolulu
Hula Bowl
Hula Bowl